Stephen M. Silverman is an American biographer, journalist, and editor. He was chief entertainment correspondent for the New York Post from 1977 to 1988, and was a news editor at Time Inc. from 1995 to 2015, where he founded the People Online Daily. He is also the author of thirteen books of cultural criticism. The Wall Street Journal called him "a veteran journalist and historian of popular culture [who] writes with verve and mischief," while Kirkus Reviews dubbed him "a deft manipulator of the devastating deadpan non-sequitur."

Career

Journalism
As a writer, critic, and editor, Silverman has contributed to Esquire, Harper’s Bazaar, New York, The New York Times, the Chicago Tribune, Newsweek,<ref>[https://www.newsweek.com/godless-side-walt-disney-371249 "The Godless Side of Walt Disney"]. Newsweek. Retrieved January 14, 2019.</ref> The Times of London, Smithsonian, Vogue, The Wall Street Journal, and The Washington Post.

Writing
Silverman's first book, Public Spectacles, is a series of "mostly unvarnished and frequently amusing vignettes" of his personal run-ins with celebrity culture. His David Lean is a biography of the acclaimed director of Lawrence of Arabia and features an introduction by Katharine Hepburn. His Dancing on the Ceiling: Stanley Donen and His Movies, with an introduction by Audrey Hepburn, examines the life and career of the master director of such musicals as Singin' in the Rain and Funny Face. He has written numerous other books, including Macy’s Thanksgiving Day Parade: A New York City Holiday Tradition, a history of the annual parade showcasing "vintage prints from the Macy’s archives," and The Catskills: Its History and How It Changed America, published by Alfred A. Knopf. His most recent book is The Amusement Park: 900 Years of Thrills and Spills, and the Dreamers and Schemers Who Built Them, published by Black Dog & Leventhal Publishers.

Television
For television, he wrote the TBS special Hot on the Trail: The Search for Sex, Love and Romance in the Old West.

Teaching
Silverman taught cultural affairs reporting and writing as an adjunct professor at the Columbia University Graduate School of Journalism in New York City.

Personal life
Stephen M. Silverman lives in New York City. His first job was selling ice cream in Disneyland.

BooksPublic Spectacles (1981) about celebrity culture; The Fox That Got Away: The Last Days of The Zanuck Dynasty at Twentieth Century-Fox (1988); David Lean (1989); Where There's a Will: Who Inherited What and Why (1991); Dancing On the Ceiling: Stanley Donen and His Movies (1996); The Last Remaining Seats: Movie Palaces of Tinseltown (1997); Funny Ladies: 100 Years of Great Comediennes (1999); Movie Mutts: Hollywood Goes to the Dogs (2001); Envy, Anger and Sweet Revenge: Hey, It Works in Hollywood! (2002); Divas! The Fabulous Photography of Kenn Duncan (2008); The Catskills: Its History and How It Changed America (2015); Macy’s Thanksgiving Day Parade: A New York City Holiday Tradition (2016); The Amusement Park: 900 Years of Thrills and Spills, and the Dreamers and Schemers Who Built Them'' (2019);

References

External links
 

1951 births
Living people
Columbia University alumni
20th-century American journalists
American male journalists
21st-century American journalists